Saudamini is a 1951 Indian, Tamil language film directed by K. B. Nagabhushanam. The film featured M. K. Radha, P. Kannamba and Akkineni Nageswara Rao.

Plot
A Maharshi (sage) blesses King Vikramasenan and Queen Saudamini to beget a child. The queen becomes pregnant. But the king is lured by the court dancer and he neglects the queen. The minister advises the queen to drive away the court dancer from the country. But the court dancer sows seeds of doubt in the king's mind that the queen is having an affair with the minister. So, the king orders the minister to be executed and sends the queen to the forest. The queen delivers a son, Udhayasenan, in the forest and he is growing up. In the meantime, the court dancer and her paramour, the commander blinds the king and take over the administration. Hearing this, the queen sends her son to get his father freed and regain the Kingdom. On his way, the prince meets princess Hemavathi and they fall in love with each other. The son defeats the commander and recaptures the Kingdom. The king's eyesight is restored with the help of an angel. The family is united.

Cast
List adapted from the database of Film News Anandan and from The Hindu review article.

Male cast
M. K. Radha
A. Nageswara Rao
T. R. Ramachandran
M. R. Swaminathan
C. V. V. Panthulu
Appa K. Duraiswamy
T. E. Krishnamachari
Jayakodi K. Natarajan

Female cast
P. Kannamba
S. Varalakshmi
T. R . Rajani
K. S. Angamuthu
Kumari Vanaja
Lakshmikantham

Production
The film was produced and directed by K. B. Nagabhushanam under the banner Sri Raja Rajeswari Film Company owned by him and P. Kannamba. (Sri Raja Rajeswari is the family deity of Kannamba.) Samudrala Sr. wrote the story and the dialogues were penned by Udhayakumar. Cinematography was handled by P. Ellappa while the editing was done by N. K. Gopal. K. R. Sharma was in charge of art direction. Choreography was done by Anil Kumar, Chopra and Vembatti Satyam. L. K. Rao handled the still photography. The film was shot and processed at Gemini Studios.

The film was also made in Telugu as Soudamini directed by K. B. Nagabhushanam. The cast was slightly different. M. K. Radha was replaced by C. S. R.

Soundtrack
Music was composed by S. V. Venkatraman while the lyrics were penned by Udhayakumar and Lakshmanadas. Playback singers are S. V. Venkatraman and M. L. Vasanthakumari.

References

Indian epic films
Indian multilingual films
Films scored by S. V. Venkatraman